Auchtubh is a hamlet in the Stirling council area of Scotland, less than  to the east of the village of Balquhidder. Auchtubh consisted of Croft's numbered 1 to 9 which were worked by Crofters raising sheep and cattle. The crofters helped each other with harvesting and other work. The last worked Croft was number 8 Auchtubh next to Coshnachie The crofter was Chrissie MacCrae who had sheep cows hens and geese. Chrissie had the Croft until her death in 1989.

At Auchtubh there is a floodplain which when flooded after heavy rain, is known as "Loch Occasional".

References

External links

Canmore - Auchtubh, Macgregor Murray Mausoleum site record
Canmore - Auchtubh, 7 Auchtoo site record

Hamlets in Stirling (council area)